ElOrgNewWave is the fifth live album by the Serbian rock band Električni Orgazam. The album featured the live versions of the song from the band's new wave period.

Track listing 
 "Električni orgazam" (5:05)
 "Vi" (2:46)
 "Pođimo" (2:41)
 "Afrika" (4:44)
 "Pojmove ne povezujem" (3:20)
 "Umetnost" (2:05)
 "Fleke" (4:22)
 "Infekcija" (4:01)
 "Dokolica" (2:43)
 "I've Got a Feeling" (3:25)
 "Znam" (3:30)
 "Leptir" (8:21)
 "Krokodili dolaze" (6:16)
 "Nebo" (7:57)
 "Konobar" (2:48)
 "Zlatni papagaj" (3:21)

Personnel 
 Srđan Gojković Gile (guitar, vocals)
 Branislav Petrović Banana (guitar, vocals)
 Ljubomir Đukić Ljuba (keyboards, vocals)
 Zoran Radomirović Švaba (bass, vocals)
 Blagoje Nedeljković Pače (drums)

Additional personnel 
 Ljubomir Jovanović Jovec (guitar on tracks 14, 15 and 16)

References

External links 
 Električni Orgazam discography at Diskografije.com
 Album review at Popboks

2007 live albums
Električni Orgazam live albums